Eyvazlı is a village in the Qubadli District of Azerbaijan. The European route E117, specifically the section between the Armenian cities of Goris and Kapan, passes through the village.

Notable natives 
 Valeh Barshadly —  the first Minister of Defense of Azerbaijan after restoration of its independence in 1991.
 Mammad Isgandarov — chairman of the Council of Ministers of Azerbaijan SSR (1959–1961), Chairman of the Presidium of the Supreme Soviet of Azerbaijan SSR (1961–1969).
 Asgar Abdullayev — Soviet and Azerbaijani electrical engineer, scientist, doctor of technical sciences (1969), the USSR State Prize laureate (1969), professor of the Academy of Sciences of the Azerbaijan SSR (1970).

References 

Populated places in Qubadli District